Christopher Clarke  (born 25 January 1990) is an English elite athlete sprinter who has often represented Great Britain and Northern Ireland. At club level he represents Marshall Milton Keynes AC and is also higher claim to Newham and Essex Beagles A.C.

Career

At the 2006 Beijing World Junior Athletics Championships Clarke won a bronze medal in the 4 × 400 metres relay. In 2007 he finished first in the 400 metres final of the World Youth Championships to win the gold medal. On 24 July 2009 he won two gold medals (400 m and 4 × 400 m) at the European Junior Championships in a new personal best of 45.59 seconds. 2009 also saw Chris selected for his first Senior Great Britain national team for the World athletics championships in Berlin.

2010 saw him compete as part of the 4 × 400 m relay team who later went on to claim a bronze medal at the world indoor athletics championships in Doha.

In 2011, Chris returned from injury to finish second at the British Championships and qualify for the World Athletics Championships. The GB relay team qualified for the final with 3:00.38 (Chris running 44.99 split). The team later went on to place seventh in the final with a time of 3:01.16.

2012 saw Chris finish 3rd in the 200m at the British Athletics Championships. He went on to represent Great Britain at the European championships later that year finishing 6th in the final. He missed qualification for the 2012 summer Olympics.

2013 saw Chris run two personal best in the 200m to finish second in the national senior ranking with 20.22 (-1.7).

In 2014, Chris reached the semi-final of the men's 200m at the commonwealth Games held in Glasgow.

February 2016, Clarke began competing as a guide runner with Paralympic silver medalist Libby Clegg. They won the gold medal in the 100 m – T11 & 200 m - T11 events at the Rio Paralympics.

Clarke was appointed Member of the Order of the British Empire (MBE) in the 2017 New Year Honours for services to sport.

In 2021, Clarke won a silver medal at the 2020 Tokyo Paralympics in the Mixed 4 x 100m relay, again as a guide runner for Clegg.

References

External links

 UKA Chris Clarke
 On the blocks
 Chris Clarke athlete profile
 

1990 births
Living people
Athletes from London
English male sprinters
British male sprinters
Black British sportsmen
Commonwealth Games competitors for England
Athletes (track and field) at the 2014 Commonwealth Games
Athletes (track and field) at the 2016 Summer Paralympics
Medalists at the 2016 Summer Paralympics
Medalists at the 2020 Summer Paralympics
Members of the Order of the British Empire
Paralympic medalists in athletics (track and field)
Paralympic gold medalists for Great Britain
Paralympic silver medalists for Great Britain
Paralympic athletes of Great Britain